Peter Baird (February 25, 1952 – July 16, 2004) was an American film actor, puppeteer and the son of puppeteer and actor Bil Baird and Cora Baird a theatre actor, dancer and puppeteer.

Personal life
Baird married Mavis Humes in early 2004, they remained married until his death on July 16, 2004.

Death
Baird died on July 16, 2004 of esophageal cancer.

Filmography
The Muppet Movie (1979) - Puppeteer
The Muppets Take Manhattan (1984) - Additional puppeteer
Howard the Duck - Howard T. Duck (head operator)
Howling III (1987) - Omega #1
Shining Time Station (1989–1993) - Grace the Bass
Davy Jones' Locker (1995) - Davy Jones, Patch
Strings (2004) - Puppeteer
Team America: World Police (2004) - Puppeteer

References

External links

1951 births
2004 deaths
American male film actors